Devon Koswal (born 21 August 2003) is a Dutch professional footballer who currently plays as a defender for Eerste Divisie club FC Dordrecht.

Club career
Koswal came through the ranks at VV Alexandria, Spartaan '20, SBV Excelsior and FC Dordrecht, and made his debut for the senior team, coming on as a substitute for Kürşad Sürmeli in a 1–0 victory over NAC Breda. He made his full debut in a 3–0 defeat to Almere City.

Personal life
Born in the Netherlands, Koswal is of Surinamese descent.

References

External links
 

2003 births
Living people
Dutch footballers
Dutch sportspeople of Surinamese descent
FC Dordrecht players
Eerste Divisie players
Association football defenders